Thomas Benton Shoaff (27 February 1897 – 15 April 1960) was an American racecar driver.

Biography
He was born on 27 February 1897 in Paris, Illinois. He died on 15 April 1960.

Indianapolis 500 results

1897 births
1960 deaths
Indianapolis 500 drivers
People from Paris, Illinois
Racing drivers from Illinois